Betsimisaraka ("the many inseparables" in the Betsimisaraka language) may refer to:

 Betsimisaraka people, a large ethnic group of Madagascar
 Betsimisaraka language, language of the Betsimisaraka people
 Betsimisaraka region, the region in Eastern Madagascar inhabited by the Betsimaraka
 Betsimisaraka (moth), a synonym of the snout moth genus Nhoabe